Below are two tables which report the average adult human height by country or geographical region. With regards the first table, original studies and sources should be consulted for details on methodology and the exact populations measured, surveyed, or considered. With regards the second table, these estimated figures for said countries and territories in 2019 and the declared sources may conflict with the findings of the first table.

First table: individual surveys and studies

Accuracy
As with any statistical data, the accuracy of the findings may be challenged. In this case, for the following reasons:

 Some studies may allow subjects to self-report values. Generally speaking, self-reported height tends to be taller than measured height, although the overestimation of height depends on the reporting subject's height, age, gender and region.
 Test subjects may have been invited instead of chosen at random, resulting in sampling bias.
 Some countries may have significant height gaps between different regions. For instance, one survey shows there is  gap between the tallest state and the shortest state in Germany. Under such circumstances, the mean height may not represent the total population unless sample subjects are appropriately taken from all regions with using weighted average of the different regional groups.
 Different social groups can show different mean height. According to a study in France, executives and professionals are  taller, and university students are  taller than the national average. As this case shows, data taken from a particular social group may not represent a total population in some countries.
 Height can vary over the course of a day, due to factors such as a decrease from exercise done directly before measurement (i.e. inversely correlated), or an increase since lying down for a significant period of time (i.e. positively correlated). Such factors may not have been controlled in all of the following studies.

Measured and self-reported figures

Note: Letters in grey indicate non-measured height.

Second table: estimated average height of 19-year-olds in 2019

Accuracy
As with any statistical data, the accuracy of the findings may be challenged. In this case, for the following reasons:

The study uses a Bayesian hierarchical model to estimate the trends in mean height from 1985 to 2019. 1,344 academics having collated the results of 2,181 studies covering 65 million people. Their findings are based on selected material rather than all available.
The figures demonstrate a discrepancy with many of the findings of the first table, for example with Bosnia and Herzegovina which is ranked sixth on the following table, an actual survey from 2014 already found males from 19–32 to average 183.9 cm as opposed to the 182.5 cm reported below; similarly Montenegro's male estimate of 183.3 cm would not compensate for the unfinished growth of an actual 182.9 cm measurement on the first table for a sample that includes 17- and 18-year olds.
Akin to the above point, the table and diagrams of this subsection are reliant on one singular publication which in turn cites surveys that cannot be scrutinised by the public since the public has no access to them (i.e. age range per study, its sample size, other background factors, etc.). Of particular interest is a round figure and in-source references for North Korea. The requisition of such claimed details is questionable in light of global difficulties in obtaining statistics from North Korea. The figure for North Korea produced in the first table confirms that the measurements actually occurred in South Korea and the sample in question had been self-admitted defectors from North Korea.
 Height can vary over the course of a day, due to factors such as a decrease from exercise done directly before measurement (i.e. inversely correlated), or an increase since lying down for a significant period of time (i.e. positively correlated). Such factors may not have been controlled in the following study.

Estimated figures
Countries and territories are sorted according to the average of the male and female mean height:

Explanatory notes

References

Average worldwide
Statistics-related lists